During the 2004–05 English football season, Leicester City F.C. competed in the Football League Championship.

Season summary
Leicester City were hoping to make an immediate return to the FA Premier League following relegation the previous season, but got off to a poor to indifferent start to the season, seeing them drawing too many games and prompting Micky Adams to resign in October despite claims by the club that they wanted him to continue. He was replaced by Hearts' Craig Levein, but he couldn't inspire Leicester to improve and the club finished the season in a disappointing 15th place.

Kit
Leicester retained the previous season's kit, manufactured by French company Le Coq Sportif and sponsored by Narborough-based bank Alliance & Leicester.

Final league table

Results summary

Results by round

Results
Leicester City's score comes first

Legend

Football League Championship

FA Cup

League Cup

Squad

Left club during season

Transfers

In

Out

Transfers in:  £1,200,000
Transfers out:  £375,000
Total spending:  £825,000

References

Leicester City F.C. seasons
Leicester City F.C.